Baliceaux is a small, privately owned  Caribbean island and is one of the Grenadines chain of islands which lie between the larger islands of Saint Vincent and Grenada. Politically, it is part of the nation of Saint Vincent and the Grenadines.

History 
Discovered by Spanish navigators during the fifteenth century, this island of 1,35 km² enjoyed a long and interesting history. It got prominence during wars 1769 - 1795 within the Caribbean region. Island highest point Gun Hill, almost 126 meters above sea level, served as an observation station for soldiers between 1772–1797.
In the 1790s, the British army banished about 5000 Black Caribs to Baliceaux following the defeat of the rebellion of Carib Chief Joseph Chatoyer in Saint Vincent. Their descendants live today as the Garifuna people in Honduras, Belize, Guatemala, Nicaragua and in the United States.

The island had a small area where the Black Caribs that died from disease were buried. This has since been eroded over time by wind and sea, and very little remains of the area where the people were buried.

To commemorate these events every year in March Pilgrimage to Balliceaux is held. It coincides with National Hero's Day in St. Vincent. 
The cultural landmark status is proposed for Baliceaux island.

See also 
First Carib War
Second Carib War

References 

Private islands of Saint Vincent and the Grenadines
Wars involving Saint Vincent and the Grenadines